Great Wraps is an American quick serve restaurant founded in 1974 with 51  locations in over 18 states, primarily in food courts. Its menu consists of hot, wrapped sandwiches (including their signature Gyro Wrap), cheesesteaks, rice bowls and frozen smoothies.

Great Wraps is a franchise, established as a company in 1974 and franchised in 1986. The company's headquarters is in Atlanta, Georgia. The chief executive officer is Mark Kaplan. Bonds rated Great Wraps as one of the top 100 North American Franchises.

References

External links 
 http://www.greatwraps.com/ - Official Site
 http://www.greatwraps.com/franchise - Great Wraps Sandwich Franchise Opportunities

Fast-food chains of the United States
Regional restaurant chains in the United States
Restaurants established in 1974